The Miss Perú 1978 pageant was held on June 1, 1978. That year, 24 candidates were competing for the two national crowns. The chosen winners represented Peru at the Miss Universe 1978 and Miss World 1978. The rest of the finalists would enter in different pageants.

Placements

Special Awards

 Best Regional Costume - Amazonas - Maiza Ezeta-García 
 Miss Photogenic - Trujillo - Lidya Solezzi
 Miss Body - La Punta - Karla Montag
 Best Hair - Europe Perú - Karin Hill Von Gordon
 Miss Congeniality - Yurimaguas - Cecilia Barboza 
 Miss Elegance - Lambayeque - Rocío Gargurevich

.

Delegates

Amazonas - Maiza Ezeta-García
Arequipa - Olga Zumarán
Asia Perú - Patty Salvederry
Barranco - Isabel Casella
Cajamarca - Elizabeth Draguilón Bonilla
Callao - Maria Luisa Correa
Cañete - Connie Pinedo
Distrito Capital - Mónica Perez-Reyes  
Europe Perú - Karin Von Gordon
Huanchaco - Maryln Vega 
La Punta - Karla Montag
Lambayeque - Rocío Gargurevich
Miraflores - Emily Ugaz
Oxapampa - Eda Kleeberg
Pisco - Orietta Canales
Punta Hermosa - Ana Zagaceta Silva
Region Lima - Ana María Carrillo
San Bartolo - Karen Noeth
San Isidro - Giuliana Forno
Surco - Cecilia Costa Morán
Tacna - Maricarmen de la Guerra
Trujillo - Lidya Solezzi
USA Perú - Joyce Anderson
Yurimaguas - Cecilia Barboza

References 

Miss Peru
1978 in Peru
1978 beauty pageants